Gordon Lethborg (23 November 1907 – 31 August 1989) was an Australian cricketer. He played four first-class matches for Tasmania between 1929 and 1933.

See also
 List of Tasmanian representative cricketers

References

External links
 

1907 births
1989 deaths
Australian cricketers
Tasmania cricketers
Cricketers from Tasmania